Adele Tonnini (born 24 June 1977) is a Sammarinese politician who is one of two Captains Regent-elects (heads of government for San Marino), that is expecting to assume office on 1 April 2023. She will serve alongside with Alessandro Scarano.

Biography 
Tonnini was born in City of San Marino and graduated the State Art Institute of Urbino and specialising in bookbinding and antique book restoration. After that, she continued her studies in conservation of cultural heritage at the University of Urbino. From 2001 to 2014 she worked at this subject, as the owner of an artisan bookbindery.

She began her political career with the newly created the RETE Movement in 2012, and is serving at the Grand and General Council in its XXX legislature since 2019. She is a delegate for San Marino at the World Food Programme and a member of the permanent Justice Commission and is passionate in environmental issues, she loves animals and her hobbies include painting, travel and engines.

On 17 March 2023 the Grand and General Council elected her and Alessandro Scarano as Captains Regent of San Marino to serve from 1 April 2023 to 1 October 2023.

References 

1977 births
Living people
People from the City of San Marino
Captains Regent of San Marino
Members of the Grand and General Council
RETE Movement politicians
University of Urbino alumni
Female heads of state